Mohammed Nabi Yusufi (1923–2005) was an Imam of the Afghan community in New York City.

In Afghanistan
Mohammed Nabi Yusufi was born in Kandahar, Afghanistan on 10 March 1923. Mohammed Nabi Yusufi was born to an ethnic Pashtun and Akhounzada Khail family. Yusufi had a burgeoning export business in Afghanistan; he had homes both in the capital Kabul and his home town of Kandahar. Yusufi fled Afghanistan with his family shortly after the Russians invaded Afghanistan in 1979.

Mohammed Nabi Yusufi held a post in King Zahir Shah's government as an emir and due to his successful business and worldly knowledge he was elected as the president of the Kandahar chamber of commerce, as well the mayor of Zabol.

He traveled extensively throughout the world due to his business and brought new ideas and teachings back to Afghanistan. He spoke five languages that included Pashto, Dari, Arabic, Urdu, and English. He lectured at hundreds of meetings, gatherings, and sermons. Yusufi was instrumental in the preservation of the Afghan culture and Islam for Afghans that were resettling in New York. This made life easier for the many Afghan immigrants that were adjusting to the new country they now called home, the United States.

Outlook
Mohammed Nabi Yusufi, despite coming from a religious, spiritual family known as the Akhounzada Khail, was a very modern man inside the conservative Islamic circles that existed in Kandahar and the U.S. He carried the same modern outlook and moderate views throughout his entire life while remaining connected to his faith. Those who knew him have said that he was an extraordinary leader during a critical era in the history of the Afghan people. He was a pioneer in the creation of the Afghan community in the western world for decades while publicly raising support for the millions of Afghans whose lives were affected by the Russian invasion inside of Afghanistan. In 1980 during a short stay in Pakistan Yusufi exhausted some effort to assist the Afghan freedom fighters. He wanted to remove Afghanistan from the claws of the Russians; however, he soon realized that these groups in Pakistan had their own political agendas which he did not want to be a part of and decided to work towards the freedom of Afghanistan from the United States.

Response to Russian invasion
During a time when the world did not know much about Afghanistan Mohammed Nabi Yusufi led groups to the United Nations to raise awareness about the Russian invasion into Afghanistan and to bring attention to the thousands of innocent Afghans that were being killed by the Soviet Union in the early 1980s. In 1985 Yusufi was asked to be the spiritual and community leader by several Afghans residing in New York City who began to realize that the settlement of Afghans in the area was increasing and they had no center for religious and cultural services. He selflessly served as the Imam of the Masjid e Syed Jamaluddin e Afghani in Queens, New York which doubles as a community center. As the Imam in New York he dealt with numerous needs inside the Afghan community and cared for all people who asked for his guidance with genuine concern for their needs.

Illness and death
Days after heading the eid prayer for thousands, On November 8, 2005, Yusufi suddenly suffered a heart attack on which doctors at Lenox Hill Hospital in New York performed a successful angioplasty. Yusufi was in fine health with no indications of heart disease prior to this heart attack. Yusufi died on November 28, 2005, from pulmonary edema which occurred as a result of the original cardiogenic shock that he suffered twenty days before his death on the morning of November 8, 2005.

There was a sudden outpouring of sadness and grief amongst the Afghan community that he served for so long. The relationship the Afghan community members had with him was of mutual respect and affection. Members of the Afghan community have said that he was a very knowledgeable man who was very fair and moderate in his views and a devout Muslim whom they viewed as a caring father figure who brought people together, and that such a man is inimitable.

During the funeral services that took place at the Masjid e Syed Jamaluddin e Afghani on a rainy day in December, the mosque was heavily packed with people, and every few minutes people were asked to leave to make room for the next round of people to have a chance to come inside the mosque for the service. People were standing in crowds outside in the cold rain for hours. It is said that you know your value by the number of people who attend your funeral. For Yusufi, his funeral exemplified that he was held in extremely high regard. When Mohammed Nabi Yusufi was asked which side he was on he would often reply "I don't have a side, I am on the side of justice and truth".

"Mohammed Nabi Yusufi, arguably the most admired and enduring leader within the Afghan community in Queens and citywide, died of congestive lung failure Nov. 28. He was 82.
For nearly 25 years Yusufi served as the spiritual imam of the Flushing Afghan mosque, Masjid e Syed Jamaluddin e Afghani. But in that role, his children said, their father inspired and united brethren from all Afghan tribes. "He brought everyone together, from all the mosques," said Hamid Yusufi, 32, one of the imam's 10 children, during a four-hour funeral service Sunday at the mosque on 149th Street. An immigrant from Kandahar, which he and his family left after the Soviet invasion of Afghanistan in 1979, Yusufi, focused his leadership in Queens on rebuilding a prosperous and peaceful Afghanistan while offering guidance and hope to the some 20,000 Afghans who live in New York City."

"He was more a political rather than a religious influence to many people," said Ahmad Yusufi, another son, referring to Afghanistan's conflict with the Soviets. His ultimate goal, he said, was "to bring peace and prosperity to Afghanistan, unite Afghans here and promote education." Indeed, a characteristic that distinguished Yusufi from other more traditional Afghan leaders was his propensity to encourage women to become educated, saying Islamic law did not prohibit it. "It would haunt him," Ahmad said, about the conservative Taliban regime's opposition to women's education. All six of his daughters received higher schooling, including his eldest, Latifa, who became a Fulbright scholar and ultimately a university professor. Through his mosque, Yusufi also set up the Afghan Immigrant Islamic Center, a resettlement service to help immigrants with family counseling, documentation and marriages. "People would call my father at 3 a.m. with questions," Ahmad said. "If he didn't have the answer, he'd look it up. He didn't have a private life. He was dedicated to the public. He was at their service." As a measure of his popularity, the day the Imam died the Afghan community took over all funeral expenses, Ahmad said. But when money was sent to a funeral home in Queens and the Washington Memorial Cemetery in Long Island, both places returned the checks.

Notes

1923 births
2005 deaths
Afghan imams
American imams
Afghan emigrants to the United States
Religious leaders from New York City